Seyfabad (also Romanized as Seyfābād; also known as Shahrak-e Qods and Shahrak-e Qodūs) is a village in Choghamish Rural District, Choghamish District, Dezful County, Khuzestan Province, Iran. At the 2006 census, its population was 456, in 94 families.

References 

Populated places in Dezful County